is a village located in Kamikawa Subprefecture, Hokkaido, Japan.

As of September 2016, the village has an estimated population of 1,251 and a density of 2.2 persons per km². The total area is 571.31 km².

Tomamu

Tomamu in the eastern part of the village area is the site of the Hoshino Resorts Tomamu, one of Hokkaido's major ski resorts, located on the southern slopes of Mount Tomamu.
The resort is dominated by four 40-storey (121 metre) high-rise towers built during the boom of the late 1980s. The exteriors of these buildings have recently been redecorated by Klein Dytham architecture (KDa) of Shibuya, Tokyo to make them harmonize better with their surroundings.

Shimukappu and Tomamu have a student exchange/sister city program with Aspen, Colorado.

Horoka Tomamu Montane Forest
Shimukappu is the location of a new nature reserve, called the Horoka Tomamu Montane Forest, established in 2010, by the United Nations International Year of Biodiversity.

Climate
According to the Köppen climate classification, Shimukappu features a humid continental climate (Dfb) with warm, wet summers and cold, extremely snowy winters.

Culture

Mascot

She is a Japanese sable with a pretty but sporty personality. She likes outdoor activities such as skiing and snowboarding. Her favorite food is milk. She is unveiled on 2 August 2014.

References

External links

Official Website 
Alpha Resort Tomamu Website
Horoka Tomamu Montane Forest Website

Villages in Hokkaido